Nail Alishov (born 30 July 2000) is an Azerbaijani footballer who plays as a goalkeeper for Zira in the Azerbaijan Premier League.

Club career
On 20 November 2021, Alishov made his debut in the Azerbaijan Premier League for Sabail match against Zira.

References

External links
 

2000 births
Living people
Association football goalkeepers
Azerbaijan youth international footballers
Azerbaijani footballers
Azerbaijan Premier League players
Sabail FK players
Zira FK players